Kirk Richard McCarthy (18 November 1966 – 15 August 2004), in Melbourne Victoria, Australia, was an Australian motorcycle road racer who competed in several major championships both at home and internationally. He was killed in an Australian Superbike Championship race at Queensland Raceway in 2004.

Superbikes

McCarthy began racing in the Australian Superbike Championship in 1992, for the Ansett Suzuki team. In 1994 he joined the crack Winfield Honda team, and went on to win the 1995 title.

This earned him a factory Superbike World Championship ride with Suzuki for 1996, finishing 13th overall without a podium.  In 1998 he did five Supersport World Championship race's (one step below World Superbike, with less powerful machines) on a Castrol Honda finishing only one race in the points.

A year in the German Superbike Championship for Suzuki, and two years back with Castrol Honda but in the British Supersport Championship, followed. In 2002 he won the AMA Pro Thunder series on a Ducati (having initially entered the season-opener as a one-off rider), before he returned to Australia, running his family's farm alongside his racing commitments. He was 7th overall in the Australian Superbike Championship in 2003.

Grand Prix

He contested the 1997 500cc World Championship on a Red Bull Yamaha, (with a best result of 12th and best grid position of 18th)

Legacy
In conjunction with a number of industry partners, his family has established an award program to assist young riders in contesting future Australian Superbike Championship (ASC) seasons.

Each year, one rider will be selected to receive the Kirk McCarthy Memorial Award, which will be in the form of financial and product support to contest the following year's ASC. The award is open to riders in all ASC classes.

A perpetual trophy will be awarded to the recipient, who will also receive a replica of the trophy at the annual ASC presentation dinner.

Career results

Grand Prix

World Superbike Championship

(key) (Races in bold indicate pole position) (Races in italics indicate fastest lap)

Supersport World Championship

References

 Career Stats at MotoGP
 Career Stats at SBK

1966 births
2004 deaths
Australian motorcycle racers
Superbike World Championship riders
Supersport World Championship riders
500cc World Championship riders
Motorcycle racers who died while racing